Mark P. Plantery (born August 14, 1959) is a Canadian retired professional ice hockey player who played 25 games in the National Hockey League (NHL) for the Winnipeg Jets during the 1980–81 season.

Plantery was born in St. Catharines, Ontario.

Career statistics

Regular season and playoffs

International

External links
 

1959 births
Living people
Brantford Alexanders players
Canadian ice hockey defencemen
Flint Generals (IHL) players
Hamilton Fincups players
HC Gardena players
Ice hockey people from Ontario
Milwaukee Admirals (IHL) players
Sportspeople from St. Catharines
Toledo Goaldiggers players
Undrafted National Hockey League players
Windsor Spitfires players
Winnipeg Jets (1979–1996) players